Sidonia (minor planet designation: 579 Sidonia) is a minor planet orbiting the Sun that was discovered by the German astronomer August Kopff on November 3, 1905. It was named after a character in Christoph Willibald Gluck's opera Armide. The name may have been inspired by the asteroid's provisional designation 1905 SD.

This is a member of the dynamic Eos family of asteroids that most likely formed as the result of a collisional breakup of a parent body.

References

External links 
 
 

000579
Discoveries by August Kopff
Named minor planets
000579
000579
19051103